Infra Corporation is a division of EMC Corporation that produces infraEnterprise, which is a multi-tier web-based IT Service Management software tool. The software is based on ITIL and it implements a number of ITIL processes, including Service Desk management (including Incident Management and Problem Management), Change Management, Release Management, Configuration Management (including Federated CMDB), Availability Management and Service Level Management. The tool also includes a knowledge base module (known as the "knowledge bank"), which complies with principles of Knowledge-Centered Support (KCS).

Infra Corporation was first established in 1991 in Australia, and now has regional head offices in North America, Australia, the UK and Europe and a worldwide network of partners and distributors. Infra was acquired by Hopkinton, Massachusetts-based EMC Corporation on 10 March 2008, in a move viewed by analysts as part of EMC's ongoing strategy to establish itself as an IT management solution provider.

In 2002, infraEnterprise was awarded PinkVerify ITIL certification from Pink Elephant, an independent consulting firm specialising in ITIL and PRINCE2. Infra has won a number of awards. In 2007, they were awarded the Network Computing magazine "Helpdesk Product of the Year" for infraEnterprise, and were awarded HDI's Best Business Use of Business Support Technology in 2006 at the 11th Annual Help Desk and IT Support Excellence Awards.

VMware acquired Ionix Service Manager (formerly Infra) in 2010 and subsequently re-branded the tool VMware Service Manager. Support for this product began on 1 July 2010  and end of support has been announced for its latest and believed last version 9.x as of 8 March 2017.

In July 2014, it was announced that VMware and IT Service Management software company Alemba had entered into an agreement to hand control of the support and development of VMware Service Manager to Alemba.

Under the terms of this agreement, Alemba has taken over all operational aspects of VMware Service Manager, including support, account management and consultancy. Full product support and a development roadmap will now continue past the previous end of availability date of March 2017.

Alemba rebranded and relicensed the VMware Service Manager product as vFire Core. In December 2014, Alemba announced the release of vFire Core 9.2.0, the first major release of the tool under Alemba's ownership.

References

External links
 Infra Corporation
 Infra Benelux 
 Infra France 
 VMware Alemba Agreement. 
 Alemba Release vFire Core 
 Alemba

Information technology management
Dell EMC
Defunct software companies of the United States